is a Japanese motorcycle rider.

Yoshikawa won the All Japan Superbike Championship in 1994 and 1999. He also participated in the World Superbike Championship, finishing 9th in the 1996 season. In 2003 Yoshikawa finished second at the Suzuka 8 Hours, partnering Shinichi Nakatomi on a Yamaha YZF-R1.

Yoshikawa is a test rider for the Yamaha factory, and helped to develop the Yamaha YZR-M1. On June 23, 2010, it was announced that Yoshikawa would replace the injured Valentino Rossi in the MotoGP Yamaha factory works team, until Rossi was again able to race.

Yoshikawa was the team manager of Yamaha's All Japan Road Race Championship factory team at the 39th "Coca-Cola Zero" Suzuka 8 Hours Endurance Road Race held during July 28 to July 31, 2016, at the Suzuka Circuit in Ino, Suzuka City, Mie Prefecture, Japan.

Career statistics

Superbike World Championship

Races by year
(key) (Races in bold indicate pole position) (Races in italics indicate fastest lap)

† Ineligible for championship points.

Grand Prix motorcycle racing

Races by year
(key) (Races in bold indicate pole position, races in italics indicate fastest lap)

References

External links

1968 births
Living people
People from Tokyo
Japanese motorcycle racers
Superbike World Championship riders
Yamaha Motor Racing MotoGP riders
MotoGP World Championship riders